Elisa Cegani (11 June 1911 – 23 February 1996) was an Italian actress. She appeared in 60 films between 1935 and 1983.

Partial filmography

 Aldebaran (1935) - Nora Bandi
 Cavalry (1936) - Speranza di Frassineto
 The Countess of Parma (1937) - Marcella
 But It's Nothing Serious (1937) - Gasperina
 Naples of Olden Times (1938) - Maria
 Ettore Fieramosca (1938) - Giovanna di Morreale
 Lancieri di Savoia (1939) - The Daughter
 Backstage (1939) - Diana Martelli - la pianista
 The Iron Crown (1941) - La madre di Elsa & Elsa
 The Jester's Supper (1942) - Laldòmine
 Gioco pericoloso (1942) - Augusta Barrat
 Harlem (1943) - La donna del gangster
 Gente dell'aria (1943) - Elena Sandri
 La carica degli eroi (1943)
 Nessuno torna indietro (1945) - Silvia Custo
 The Ten Commandments (1945) - (segment "Non dire falsa testimonianza")
 Un giorno nella vita (1946) - Suor Maria
 Eleonora Duse (1947) - Eleonora Duse
 Monaca di Monza (1947)
 Fabiola (1949) - Sira
 The Glass Castle (1950) - Eléna
 In Olden Days (1952) - Giulia Fabbri (segment "La morsa")
 La fiammata (1952) - Yvonne Stettin
 Fishing School (1952) - Madame Charpentier
 The Enemy (1952) - Duchessa Anna di Nemi
 Prisoner in the Tower of Fire (1952) - Bianca Maltivoglio
 Passionate Song (1953) - Carla Parodi
 A Slice of Life (1954) - Contessa Livia (segment "Scena all'aperto)
 Nel gorgo del peccato (1954) - Margherita Valli
 House of Ricordi (1954) - Giuseppina Strepponi
 A Free Woman (1954) - La signora Giovanna Franci
 The Courier of Moncenisio (1954)
 Loving You Is My Sin (1954) - Countess Danieli - Giorgio's mother
 Graziella (1955) - Madre di Alphonse
 Nana (1955) - Comtesse Muffat
 Lucky to Be a Woman (1956) - Elena Sennetti
 La donna del giorno (1957) - Signora Attenni
 Amore e chiacchiere (Salviamo il panorama) (1958) - Signora Clara Bonelli
 Si le roi savait ça (1958) - Norine
 The Adventures of Nicholas Nickleby (1958, TV series) -  Signorina La Creevy
 Ciao, ciao bambina! (1959) - Bice Pavese - la moglie di Filippo
 Constantine and the Cross (1961) - Elena
 The Last Judgment (1961) - Giovanna's mother
 La monaca di Monza (1962) - La Monaca Portinaia
 The Reluctant Saint (1962) - Sister
 Perseo l'invincibile (1963) - Danae
 Jacob and Esau (1963) - Rebecca - Rebekah
 Liolà (1964) - Aunt Gesa
 Saul e David (1964) - Akhinoam
 Me, Me, Me... and the Others (1966) - Francesca, Peppino's Housekeeper
 Un killer per sua maestà (1968)
 Simón Bolívar (1969) - Conchita Diaz Moreno
 La rosa rossa (1973)
 Languidi baci... perfide carezze (1976) - Clorinda
 Beyond Good and Evil (1977) - Franziska / Fritz's mother
 Tomorrow We Dance (1982) - Mother of Mariangela

References

External links

1911 births
1996 deaths
20th-century Italian actresses
Italian film actresses